Mežakla is a long undulating plateau about  long in the foothills of the Julian Alps above the town of Jesenice in northwestern Slovenia. It is mostly covered with spruce and beech trees. There are many pastures and clear streams on the plateau. Mežakla is part of Triglav National Park but tourism is underdeveloped.

Name
The name Mežakla was first attested in written sources as Moshägkhlä in 1579 (and as Musakhla in 1609 and Meſaqua in 1744). The name is derived from the dialect word mežek 'juvenile bear'.

References

External links 
 
 Mežakla on Geopedia

Plateaus in Upper Carniola
Karst plateaus of Slovenia
Triglav National Park